Yellow waterlily is a common name for several plants and may refer to:

 Nymphaea species, especially:
 Nymphaea mexicana, native to the United States and Mexico
 Nuphar species, especially:
 Nuphar lutea
 Nuphar polysepala, native to western North America